The Fundación Colegio Americano de Quito or Colegio Americano de Quito (American School of Quito) is a  private college preparatory school in Quito, Ecuador. In 1940 it was founded by the former president of Ecuador and the president of the Organization of American States (OAS) Galo Plaza Lasso, and Boaz Long.

History
The American School of Quito was founded on October 14, 1940 to 162 students. The first directors were Robert E. and Mrs. Hazel J. Tucker, who had just arrived from the United States. The founders of the school lived in a time characterized by the fascist movements in Europe, represented in Ecuador and other South American nations by the German and Italian schools operating there. The two founders wanted to counter this. They had a vision of educating the youth of Ecuador in democratic values  knowing these students would become the future leaders. Boaz Long, the U.S. minister to Ecuador, helped get supplies from the U.S. to establish the school. The school hired English-speaking, U.S.-educated Ecuadorian teachers to teach civics, geography, history of Ecuador, and Spanish classes, while Americans taught the other classes. The Ecuadorian Ministry of Education cooperated with the foundation of the school. The U.S. and Ecuadorian governments did not have plans to financially aid the school. The school used an educational program derived from the Santa Barbara, California public schools and the Columbia University Lincoln School.

In 2022 the American School had over 2,200 students from Nursery to twelfth grade. Among these students are the children and grandchildren of founding families. The school is co-educational, non-religious, and is a non-profit foundation. It is accredited by Cognia and the Ecuadorian Ministry of Education and Culture. It is recognized by the International Baccalaureate Organization and offers both I.B. Programmes: Middle Years and Diploma. American School graduates can obtain three diplomas: a high school diploma accredited in the United States, the Ecuadorian Bachillerato, and the I.B. Diploma.

Student Council
Every year students from high school vote for the Student Council. The student Council is a group of representatives for high school that run activities and organize events. Candidates from the Student Council come from 11th or 12th (Secretary, Treasurer and Vice-President), and 12th grade only (President).

Model United Nations
The School hosts the largest Model United Nations in Spanish each year, which include local schools, thus contributing to the practice of democratic principles and the analysis of global and local issues in Ecuador.

Hymn
Gloria a tí, Colegio Americano

Notable alumni and staff
Barbara Morgan taught here from 1978 to 1979. She taught English and science for one year. She was later an astronaut on the Space Shuttle.

Marcelo Aguirre, artist
 Rodrigo Borja, former President of Ecuador;
 Francisco Carrion, Minister of Foreign Affairs for Ecuador; 
 Diego Fernando Cordova, former Ecuadorian ambassador
 David Davidovic, Vice-President at Merck, Genentech and Roche 
 Gina Davidovic, President of Bay3000 Corporate Education 
 Freddy Ehlers, journalist, Minister
 Luis Fierro, economist, writer, former Vice-Minister of Economy of Ecuador  
Santiago Gangotena González, earned a PhD degree in Physics from University of North Carolina, Chapell Hill and founded the first liberal arts university in Ecuador, Universidad San Francisco de Quito
Edna Iturralde, author 
Joseph J. Kohn, Princeton Maths Professor
Carlos Larreategui, former Minister, Chancellor of UDLA (Universidad de Las Americas)
 César Montúfar, presidential candidate, former Member of the National Assembly, Ph.D. in Political Science
 Verónica Montúfar, secretaria ejecutiva Amnistía internacional Ecuador (1991-1996), Responsable de Igualdad de género y de trabajadores con discapacidad (ISP Ecuador).

Gian-Carlo Rota, mathematician and MIT professor,
 Guadalupe Mantilla, Director of the newspaper "El Comercio"
 Alvaro Mantilla, Director of the newspaper "Hoy"
 Martin Pallares, journalist and writer
 Rodrigo Paz, former mayor of Quito
 Frank Wilbauer, Director of the Red Cross, Ecuador
 Seye Adelekan, Musician
 Maria Fernanda Rea, Vice-President and Corporate Controller of Geodis Logistics Co.
 Xavier Ponce, Chairman of the Ecuadorian American Chamber of Commerce

See also
 Americans in Ecuador
 Ecuador–United States relations

External links
 School website
 sacs casi webpage

Further reading
 Heredia, Juan Carlos. "Propuesta de un modelo de evaluación participativa del desempeño profesional para los docentes de sexto grado del programa de años intermedios del Colegio Americano de Quito" (master's thesis). Facultad de Ciencias de la Educación. Pontificia Universidad Catolica del Ecuador (PUCE). Quito. 2007. 135 p.
 Durán Jaramillo, María Elizabeth and Andrés Sánchez Salazar. "Diseño de propuesta del mejoramiento del proceso de selección de docentes en la Fundación Colegio Americano de Quito" (thesis). Pontificia Universidad Catolica del Ecuador (PUCE). Quito. February 2005.
 Flores, Susana and María José Pasquel. "Guía didáctica metodológica para enseñar nociones y conceptos matemáticos y geométricos con material concreto en niños y niñas de 4 - 5 años aplicada al pre-kinder del Colegio Americano de Quito" (Tesis de pegrado). Universidad Politécnica Salesiana. April 15, 2004. See profile page.
 "Education: Cooperative Style The American School of Quito. The Grace Log, Volumes 18-21. W. R.Grace & Company, 1935??. p. 14-15-?
 Ward, Douglas S. "The American School of Quito." Intellect, Volume 64, 1946. Start p. 385.
 "La Cooperativa Colegio Americano de Quito." El Año ecuatoriano. 1952. p. 120-122-? (Search page). "El mes de octubre de 1940 el Colegio Americano de Quito abría sus puertas a cien alumnos matriculados en su primer año escolar, como culminación de un esfuerzo y de un ideal de asociación propugnado por un grupo de caballeros que[...]"

Bibliography 

 

Secondary schools in Quito
American international schools in Ecuador
International Baccalaureate schools in Ecuador
International schools in Quito
Private schools in Ecuador
Educational institutions established in 1940
Ecuador–United States relations
Association of American Schools in South America
1940 establishments in Ecuador